Ugly Aur Pagli is a 2008 Indian Hindi comedy film starring Ranvir Shorey and Mallika Sherawat. It is directed by Sachin Khot and produced by Pritish Nandy. The film tells the story of the strange relationship between a young Mumbai engineering student and a girl he meets on the train. Ugly Aur Pagli is an uncredited remake of the Korean film My Sassy Girl with many scenes taken directly from the original film.

Plot
Kabir (Ranvir Shorey) is an engineering student who has been studying engineering for the last ten years. He is a carefree lifestyle guy, which involves partying with friends and not caring about his responsibilities. And one cold winter night on way back to home at VT station in Mumbai he meets a drunk Kuhu (Mallika Sherawat).

Kabir thinks that his lifelong dream of having a girlfriend has come true, but for Kuhu he’s just a loser she wants to take for a ride. She makes him dance around in circles, run semi naked, ride cycles without seats, wear high heeled ladies shoes and so on. Kuhu, who is coping with a personal crisis, feels that the only way she can overcome it is to put someone else through misery. Kabir becomes the guinea pig and has to cope with the insane demands and tantrums of Kuhu.

Initially wary of Kuhu, Kabir slowly eases up to her and understands her feelings. The story takes a turn when Kabir discovers the true meaning of Kuhu's actions, and their implications follow.

Cast
 Ranvir Shorey ... Kabir Acharekar
 Mallika Sherawat ... Kuhumini
 Vishal Malhotra ... Raj Acharya
 Tinu Anand ... Kuhu's father
 VJ Manish ... Bilal Ahmed, Kabir's friend
 Sushmita Mukherjee ... Kuhu's mother
 Gaurav Kapur ... Hemal
 Bharti Achrekar ... Kabir's mother 
 Payal Rohatgi ... Girl in Bar and Elevator (Guest appearance)
 Sapna Bhavnani ... Aditi (Guest appearance)
 Zeenat Aman ... Sandhya (Special appearance)
 Sayaji Shinde ... Manager

Reception

Box office
Worldwide, the film grossed slightly over $7 million.

Critical response
The film had a mixed critical reception. There was praise for the performances of the lead pair and criticism of the film's plot.

Raja Sen of Rediff.com gave the film 1.5 stars out of 5, writing "My Sassy Girl works largely because the tone of everything in the film -- save from the cocky titular heroine -- is normal as toast, which is why placing sauce on it is tasty. Here, the treatment is consistently over-the-top and gets tiresome after the first act. While some of the lines are wicked good -- especially Ranvir's VO, which quirkily once labels Mallika a cross between Medha Patkar and Keshto Mukherjee -- there just aren't enough of them. Rajeev Masand in his reviews for CNN-IBN gave the film 2 stars out of 5, saying "I’m going with two out of five for director Sachin Khot’s Ugly Aur Pagli, shame on him and his writers for ripping off a film from start to finish and yet failing to come up with something half-way entertaining." Khalid Mohamed writing for Hindustan Times gave the film 2 stars out of 5.

Music 
The film's music was composed by Anu Malik with lyrics by Amitabh Verma.
 "Karle Gunaah"- Ishq Bector, Anushka Manchanda
 "Karle Gunaah II" – Ishq Bector, Krishna Beura
 "Karle Gunaah (Remix By DJ A-Myth)" – Ishq Bector, Anushka Manchanda
 "Shut Up, Aa Nachle" – Anu Malik, Vasundhara Das, Dibyendu Mukherji
 "Talli" – Anmol Malik, Hard Kaur, Mika Singh
 "Talli II" – Anmol Malik, Hard Kaur
 "Talli (Remix By DJ A-Myth)" –  Anmol Malik, Hard Kaur, Mika Singh, J.J
 "Yaad Teri Aaye" – Mohit Chauhan
 "Ye Nazar" – Sunidhi Chauhan, Shaan

References

External links
 

2008 films
Films scored by Anu Malik
2000s Hindi-language films
Rail transport films
Indian romantic comedy films
Indian remakes of South Korean films
2008 romantic comedy films